The Gyerim is a small woodland in Gyeongju National Park, Gyeongju, South Korea. The name literally means "rooster forest."  The grove lies near the old site of the Silla kingdom palace in central Gyeongju. Nearby landmarks include the Banwolseong fortress,  Cheomseongdae, the Gyeongju National Museum, and the Royal Tombs Complex.

History
The original name of Gyerim was Sirim (시림, 始林). However, according to the Samguk Sagi, a 12th-century Korean history, Sirim was the site where the child Kim Alji, founder of the Gyeongju Kim clan, was discovered.  Found in a golden box accompanied by a rooster, he was adopted by the royal family. His descendants became the later kings of Silla and the forest where he was found was renamed Gyerim, "Rooster Forest." The Samgungnyusa, a 13th-century miscellanea of tales relating to the Three Kingdoms of Korea, gives a different origin of the term Gyerim. According to that text, the founder of Silla, Hyeokgeose, was born at a stream called Gyejeong (계정, 鷄井), "rooster well," and that his future consort was born from a dragon that came to earth at another place called Gyeryongseo (계룡서, 鷄龍瑞), and for this reason the area was renamed Gyerim.

However, it is presumed that Gim's Legend related to Gye(계,鷄) was mixed with the legend of state's founder.
Because, The source of these records is a comprehensive record of verbal legends in the 13th century written by Buddhist monks. 
There is a difference of more than 1000 years from the time when the incident occurred.
In the Samguk Sagi, a more reliable history book, Legend related to Gye(계,鷄) is mentioned only in Gim Al-ji's part, but not in Hyeokgeose's part.

Based upon the legends of Silla's founding, Gyerim also became a sobriquet for that state. The earliest recorded reference we have of Gyerim being used to designate Silla is from the Chinese histories. The Old Book of Tang records that in 663 Emperor Gaozong of Tang designated Silla the Gyerim Territory Area Command and Munmu of Silla as its commander-in-chief. The early eighth-century Sillan scholar Kim Dae-mun authored a no longer extant book of tales of Silla entitled Gyerim japjeon.

Gyerim also appears in the title of the early twelfth-century Chinese work Gyerim yusa, which provides one of the earliest sources of information on the pronunciation of the native Korean language.

Historical landmark
Being considered a holy place, a monument commemorating the birth legend of Kim Alji was built in 1803 by the Joseon. Gyerim has been designated as historical landmark #19 from the Korean government since January, 1963. The grounds cover 7,300 m2 and has a dense forest of old oak, ash, zelkova, willow, Japanese clovers, scarlet maple and Japanese pagoda trees.

Gallery

See also
History of Korea

References

External links

Gyeongju National Park introduction Korea National Park Service

Geography of North Gyeongsang Province
Gyeongju
Historic Sites of South Korea
Forests of South Korea
Tourist attractions in Gyeongju